Ivar Stukolkin (born 13 August 1960) is a retired Estonian swimmer. He is an Olympic champion in swimming.

Achievements
Besides two Olympic medals Stukolkin won a silver medal at the 1982 World Championships (4×200 m freestyle relay). He has been Soviet Union champion once in 1978 and has won sixteen titles in Estonian SSR.

Records
Stukolkin set 32 Estonian national records. His 1980 national record in 400 metre freestyle swimming 3.53,95 stood 39 years until it was broken in 2019.

References

 
YouTube heat 400 m freestyle Olympic Games -80

1960 births
Living people
Swimmers from Tallinn
Estonian male freestyle swimmers
Soviet male freestyle swimmers
Olympic swimmers of the Soviet Union
Olympic gold medalists for the Soviet Union
Olympic bronze medalists for the Soviet Union
Swimmers at the 1980 Summer Olympics
Olympic bronze medalists in swimming
World Aquatics Championships medalists in swimming
Estonian people of Russian descent
Medalists at the 1980 Summer Olympics
Olympic gold medalists in swimming
Estonian swimming coaches